The Truth Tour was the second concert tour by American recording artist Usher. Visiting Africa, North America and Europe, the tour accompanies his fourth studio album, Confessions. The tour commenced on May 21, 2004, in Johannesburg and concluded on October 15, 2004, in Hartford.  It was ranked as one of the highest-grossing tours of 2004 in North America, grossing $29.1 million.

Background
This was Raymond's second tour. He stated to the Daily Press: "before I get ready to put my shows together, I always go to New York. I go to Vegas. I go to Atlantic City, and I sit down at the shows, and I get some inspiration from there", Usher said. He also looks at tapes of old "Soul Train" TV shows to get ideas for choreography. Raymond enlisted stylist Tameka Foster to create his wardrobe for the tour.

Concert synopsis
The tour set featured a small stage up on top of the main stage, where the band played. Usher was occupied by his eight supporting dancers. Attached to the smaller stage was a mini platform which lowered to the main stage attached by two big staircases on both sides of it. To the left, a group of circular staircases climbed to the top, and to the right, there was a fire escape replete with steps and an elevator. Usher's entrance was a short movie showing him getting dressed and walking to the concert venue, following on with him performing the opening song "Caught Up", with Usher dressed in all white while wearing an all-white glove. The second song performed was "You Make Me Wanna...", where two dancers stayed on the top stage with Usher while two male dancers came out to the lower level with two chairs each in their hands. Each dancer threw one chair up to the top, with Usher already in hand with his own chair, following a set dance routine from the video. Following this, Usher performed "U Remind Me", where he danced by himself during a breakdown of the track doing his signature handstand that makes the initials "UR".

Next he performed "My Way" dressed in the attire from his video doing similar routines after the song begun a dance break where Usher and his dancer began breakdancing. He changed wardrobe and appears on the small stage wearing a black dress shirt, black fedora a and white studded pants singing "Follow Me". This leads "That's What It's Made For", before he goes into his next song he shows gratitude to his audience. He begins singing excerpts from "Superstar" with the help of his background singers while on top of the small stage. He walks over to the circular staircase where his mic stand is and he begins singing "Nice & Slow". The mini platform lifts him in the sky as he begins to sing "U Got it Bad". Next he introduces his eight dancers into him singing "U Don't Have to Call".

Just Blaze playing tour DJ appears on the top platform plays the next song "Throwback" that he produced. Usher walks out in Michael Vick's Atlanta Falcons jersey to sing his verse, Rico Loves joins him on stage rapping his verse.  Following on with the song "Bad Girl", where Usher was dressed up in a lavender suit and came out in a chrome chair. During the song, Usher picked out a female from the crowd, transitioning to "Superstar", singing to the fan. Usher continued singing to the fan, performing "Can U Handle It?", closing the song by kissing the fan who then left the stage. A video interlude played then Usher came out sitting in a chair performing with Confessions then Kanye West joins him rap his verse from Confessions Remix. Completing another wardrobe chain he comes out in his signature outfit an Atlanta Braves fitted cap, Blazer, and Jeans singing "Burn". He finishes his performance doing the hit single "Yeah!".

Broadcasts and recordings 
The concert was recorded on October 2 and 3, 2004 at Philips Arena in Atlanta, GA. Showtime broadcast the show during a special titled One Night, One Star: Usher Live at Coliseo de Puerto Rico. Raymond during this concert special brought out special guests Lil Jon, Ludacris, Daddy Yankee, Fat Joe, and Beyoncé to perform a dance routine to "Bad Girl" choreographed by Frank Gatson, Jr.

On September 16, 2005, the DVD of The Truth Tour: Behind The Tour was certified 7× Platinum by RIAA.

Personnel
Musical director: Valdez Brantley
Drums: Aaron Spears
Guitars: Juan "Johnny" Najera
Keyboards/MD: Arthur "Buddy" Strong
Background vocalist: Sy Smith, Di Reed, BJ Sledge, Brandon Rodgers, Ryon Lovett

Opening acts
JoJo 
Kanye West 
Christina Milian 
Cassidy

Setlist
The following setlist was obtained from the concert held on August 5, 2004, at the Hampton Coliseum in Hampton, Virginia. It does not represent all concerts for the duration of the tour.
"Video Sequence"
"Caught Up"
"You Make Me Wanna..."
"U Remind Me"
"My Way"
"Follow Me"
"That's What It's Made For"
"Nice & Slow"
"U Got It Bad"
"Video Sequence"
"U Don't Have to Call"
"Throwback"
"Bad Girl"
"Can U Handle It?"
"Superstar"
"Do It to Me"
"Confessions (Interlude)" / "Confessions Part II"
Encore
"Video Sequence"
"Burn"
"Yeah!"

Tour dates

Cancellations and rescheduled shows

Box office score data

References

Usher (musician) concert tours
2004 concert tours